Hindustani, also known as Hindi-Urdu, like all Indo-Aryan languages, has a core base of Sanskrit-derived vocabulary, which it gained through Prakrit. As such the standardized registers of the Hindustani language (Hindi-Urdu) share a common vocabulary, especially on the colloquial level. However, in formal speech, Hindi tends to draw on Sanskrit, while Urdu turns to Persian and sometimes Arabic. This difference lies in the history of Hindustani, in which the lingua franca started to gain more Persian words in urban areas (such as Delhi, Lucknow and Hyderabad), under the Delhi Sultanate; this dialect came to be termed Urdu.

The original Hindi dialects continued to develop alongside Urdu and according to Professor Afroz Taj, "the distinction between Hindi and Urdu was chiefly a question of style. A poet could draw upon Urdu's lexical richness to create an aura of elegant sophistication, or could use the simple rustic vocabulary of dialect Hindi to evoke the folk life of the village. Somewhere in the middle lay the day to day language spoken by the great majority of people. This day to day language was often referred to by the all-encompassing term Hindustani." In Colonial India, Hindi-Urdu acquired vocabulary introduced by Christian missionaries from the Germanic and Romanic languages, e.g. pādrī (Devanagari: पादरी, Nastaleeq: پادری) from padre, meaning pastor.

When describing the state of Hindi-Urdu under the British Raj, Professor Śekhara Bandyopādhyāẏa stated that "Truly speaking, Hindi and Urdu, spoken by a great majority of people in north India, were the same language written in two scripts; Hindi was written in Devanagari script and therefore had a greater sprinkling of Sanskrit words, while Urdu was written in Persian script and thus had more Persian and Arabic words in it. At the more colloquial level, however, the two languages were mutually intelligible." After the partition of India, political forces within India tried to further Sanskritize Hindi, while political forces in Pakistan campaigned to remove Prakit/Sanskrit derived words from Urdu and supplant them with Persian and Arabic words. Despite these government efforts, the film industry, Bollywood continues to release its films in the original Hindustani (Hindi-Urdu) language, easily understood and enjoyed by speakers of both registers; in addition, many of the same television channels are viewed across the border.

Linguistic classification
Hindi (हिन्दी Hindi) is one of the Indo-Aryan languages of the Indo-European language family. The core of Hindi vocabulary is thus etymologically Indo-European. However, centuries of borrowing has led to the adoption of a wide range of words with foreign origins.

Examples of borrowed words

Due to centuries of contact with Europeans, Turkic peoples, Arabs, Persians, and East Asians, Hindi-Urdu has absorbed countless words from foreign languages, often totally integrating these borrowings into the core vocabulary. The most common borrowings from foreign languages come from three different kinds of contact. Close contact with neighboring peoples facilitated the borrowing of words from other Indian languages, Chinese, Burmese, and several indigenous Austroasiatic languages of North India. After centuries of invasions from Persia and the Middle East, particularly under the Mughal Empire, numerous Turkish, Arabic, and Persian words were absorbed and fully integrated into the lexicon. Later, European colonialism brought words from Portuguese, French, Dutch, and most significantly English. Some very common borrowings are shown below.

Borrowings from neighboring languages

Austroasiatic languages ( देशज دیشج Deshaj)

Chinese ( चीनी چینی Chīnī)

Borrowings from the Mughal era

Arabic (अरबी عربی Arbī)

Persian (फ़ारसी فارسی)

Turkish (तुर्की ترکی Turkī)

Borrowings from the Colonial Era

Portuguese (पुर्तगाली پرتگالی Purtugālī)
Portuguese borrowings mostly describe household items, fruits, and religious concepts dealing with Catholicism:

Household

Religion

Other

French (फ़्रान्सीसी فرانسیسی Fransisi)
Only a handful of French borrowings are still used in Hindi today.

English (अंग्रेज़ी انگریزی Aṅgrezī)
Most borrowed words of European origin in Hindi-Urdu were imported through English and involve civic and household concepts:

Civic Life

Household

References

See also 
Hindustani etymology
Hindustani grammar
Hindustani orthography
Hindustani phonology
Hindi-Urdu kinship terms

Vocabulary
Hindi

Urdu
Lexis (linguistics)